EIEIO may refer to:

 The refrain to the children's song, "Old MacDonald Had a Farm"
 Enforce In-Order Execution of I/O, a machine instruction used on the PowerPC computer processor
 Computer bought the farm, an error message with symbol EIEIO, from the GNU Hurd operating system
 EIEIO, the Enhanced Implementation of Emacs Interpreted Objects, an object-oriented elisp system based on the Common Lisp Object System
"E-I-E-I-O", an episode of Barney & Friends from the fourth season of the show